British 4th Cavalry Division may refer to:
1st Indian Cavalry Division which was designated 4th Cavalry Division from November 1916 to March 1918 in France in World War I
4th Cavalry Division (British Indian Army) which served from July 1918 in Palestine in World War I